Salt Bridge is an Indian drama film produced and directed by Indian writer and director Abhijit Deonath. It tells the story of a man who left India to live in a small town in Australia, looking for a better future. He befriends an Australian woman. Their friendship, being unorthodox in their community, becomes a problem to other Indian people living in Salt Bridge. The film was released in Australia on 27 July 2017 and in India on 4 January 2019.

Cast
 Rajeev Khandelwal as Basant
 Chelsie Preston Crayford as Madhurima
 Usha Jadhav as Lipi
 Kaushik Das as Shubhro
 Mayur Kamble as Deep
 Adam Grant as John
 Asim Das as Shantanu

Plot
Basant is the newest migrant in Salt Bridge, which already houses a small Indian community. He lives a happy, frictionless life with his wife and son, until he befriends Madhurima, a married woman. The friendship that starts between the two is highly questionable to the Indian community living in Salt Bridge.

References

External links
 
 
 

2010s Hindi-language films
Films shot in Australia